Veritas University is a private university, located in Abuja. It was founded in March 2002 by the Catholic Church in Nigeria. The Institution received its provisional operation licence in 2007 from the National Universities Commission and commenced admission of students in October 2008, at its take-off campus in Obehie, Abia State, Nigeria.

History 
Veritas University Abuja (VUNA), also known as the Catholic University of Nigeria, was founded by the Catholic Bishops Conference of Nigeria through a resolution given at its March 2002 meeting in Abuja. The initiative was born by the collective desire of the attending Bishops for a University that would provide high quality tertiary education according to the tradition of the Catholic Church.

The Institution received its provisional operation licence in 2007 from the National Universities Commission and commenced admission of students in October 2008 at its take-off campus in Obehie, Abia State, Nigeria. In 2014, it moved to its permanent site with its campus now located in the Bwari Area council of the Federal Capital Territory, Abuja. Nigeria.

The University emphasizes moral values, self-reliance and the development of the students’ entrepreneurial capabilities for the social and economic benefit of the graduates and the Nigerian society.

Academics
The University currently offers undergraduate and postgraduate programs across five faculties:

Natural and Applied Sciences 
B.Sc. Applied Chemistry
 B.Sc. Physics
B.Sc. Biochemistry
 B.Sc. Biological Sciences
B.Sc. Computer and Information Technology

Management Sciences 
 B.Sc. Accounting
B.Sc. Banking and Finance
 B.Sc. Business Administration
 B.Sc. Entrepreneurship
B.Sc. Public Administration

Humanities 
B.A. English and Literary Studies
 B.A. History and International Relations
B.A. Philosophy
B.A. Religion and Intercultural Studies

Social Sciences 
 B.Sc. Economics
B.Sc. Mass Communication
 B.Sc. Political Science

Education 
 B.Ed. Science Education
 B.Ed. Educational Foundation
 B.Ed. Arts and Social Science

Postgraduate Studies 

 Post-graduate Diploma (PGD)
 Masters of Art (M.A.)
 Master of Science (M.Sc.)

Accreditation 

A provisional License to operate the university was granted by the National Universities Commission in May 2007.
 As at 2019, there were over 30 undergraduate and 15 Post Graduate programmes offered by the university, which have passed the National Universities Commission (NUC) accreditation and resource verification.

In March 2019, Veritas University awarded certificates to 141 graduating students for its 2017/18 academic session at its 7th convocation ceremony.

Veritas Journal of Humanities 
The Veritas Journal of Humanities (VEJOH) is the official maiden multidisciplinary academic journal of Veritas University from the Humanities Faculty published bi-annually. It is based on the following principles; Afroconstructivity, Humanity, Society and Development. Articles come from scholars within and outside Africa.

Gallery

References

External links 
 
Universities in Nigeria
Accredited Universities in Nigeria

See also 
Academic libraries in Nigeria

Education in Abuja
Veritas University
Educational institutions established in 2002
2002 establishments in Nigeria
Catholic universities and colleges in Nigeria
Academic libraries in Nigeria